The 1916 Brown Bears football team was an American football team that represented Brown University as an independent during the 1916 college football season. In its 15th season under head coach Edward N. Robinson, Brown compiled an 8–1 record and outscored opponents by a total of 254 to 27. The team played its home games at Andrews Field in Providence, Rhode Island.

Schedule

References

Brown
Brown Bears football seasons
Brown Bears football